L'Ipermestra is an 18th-century Italian opera in 3 acts by the Czech composer Josef Mysliveček composed to the libretto Ipermestra by the Italian poet Metastasio first set by Hasse in 1744. This opera (and all the rest of Mysliveček's operas) belong to the serious type in Italian language referred to as opera seria.

Performance history
The opera was first performed at the Teatro della Pergola in Florence on 17 March 1769. Florence had been a frequent stopping-place for Mysliveček after he arrived in Italy from Prague in 1763, but L'Ipermestra was the first dramatic work that he succeeded in getting produced there.  Later there would be two other operas (Motezuma in 1771 and Adriano in Siria in 1776) and three oratorios (Adamo ed Eva in 1771, La passione in 1773, and Isacco figura del redentore in 1776).  The production was graced with the presence of the great German tenor Anton Raaff, a close friend and professional associate of the composer who contributed greatly to the success of Mysliveček's break-through opera, Il Bellerofonte of 1767. L'Ipermestra was first revived in modern times in a concert version performed in Brno in 1970, then a staged version in the same city performed in 1986.

Roles

Vocal set pieces

Act I, scene 1 - Aria of Elpinice, "Abbiam penato, è ver" 
Act I, scene 2 - Aria of Danao, "Pensa che figlia sei" 
Act I, scene 3 - Aria of Ipermestra, "Ah, non parlar d'amore" 
Act I, scene 4 - Aria of Linceo, "Di pena sì forte" 
Act I, scene 6 - Aria of Plistene, "Ma rendi pur contento" 
Act I, scene 9 - Aria of Ipermestra, "Se pietà da voi non trovo" 
Act I, scene 10 - Aria of Linceo, "Io non pretendo, o stelle"

Act II, scene 1 - Aria of Adrasto, "Pria di lasciar la sponda" 
Act II, scene 2 - Aria of Danao, "Non hai cor per un'impresa" 
Act II, scene 3 - Aria of Ipermestra, "Se il mio duol, se i mali miei" 
Act II, scene 5 - Aria of Linceo, "Gonfio tu vedi il fiume" 
Act II, scene 6 - Aria of Plistene, "Vuoi ch'io lasci, o mio tesoro" [a non-Metastasian text] 
Act II, scene 7 - Aria of Elpinice, "Mai l'amor mio verace" 
Act II, scene 9 - Aria of Danao, "Or del tuo ben la sorte" 
Act II, scene 10 - Accompanied recitative for Ipermestra and Linceo, "Ferma, oimè" 
Act II, scene 10 - Duet of Ipermestra and Linceo, "Ah, se di te mi privi"

Act III, scene 2 - Aria of Ipermestra, "Và, più non dirmi infida"  
Act III, scene 4 - Aria of Linceo, "Nel pensar che l'idol mio" 
Act III, scene 7 - Aria of Danao, "Ah, di calma un sol momento" [a non-Metastasian text]

References

Italian-language operas
Operas by Josef Mysliveček
1769 operas
Opera seria
Operas